White Creek Historic District is a national historic district located at White Creek in Washington County, New York.  It includes 20 contributing buildings.  The buildings are predominantly residential and were built between 1770 and 1885. The majority are Greek Revival in style, with representatives of the Federal and Queen Anne styles.  Greek Revival style commercial structures are also present and include a church, hotel / tavern, general store, and harness shop.

It was listed on the National Register of Historic Places in 1979.

Gallery

References

Historic districts on the National Register of Historic Places in New York (state)
Houses on the National Register of Historic Places in New York (state)
Federal architecture in New York (state)
Greek Revival architecture in New York (state)
Historic districts in Washington County, New York
Houses in Washington County, New York
National Register of Historic Places in Washington County, New York